(born 9 March 1974) is a Japanese professional golfer.

Ueda plays on the Japan Golf Tour, where he has won once.

Professional wins (2)

Japan Golf Tour wins (1)

Japan Challenge Tour wins (1)

External links

Japanese male golfers
Japan Golf Tour golfers
Sportspeople from Gifu Prefecture
1974 births
Living people